Cormac McCarthy (born Charles Joseph McCarthy Jr., July 20, 1933) is an American writer who has written twelve novels, two plays, five screenplays and three short stories, spanning the Western and post-apocalyptic genres. He is known for his graphic depictions of violence and his unique writing style, recognizable by a sparse use of punctuation and attribution. McCarthy is widely regarded as one of the greatest contemporary American writers.

McCarthy was born in Providence, Rhode Island, although he was raised primarily in Tennessee. In 1951, he enrolled in the University of Tennessee, but dropped out to join the US Air Force. His debut novel, The Orchard Keeper, was published in 1965. Awarded literary grants, McCarthy was able to travel to southern Europe, where he wrote his second novel, Outer Dark (1968). Suttree (1979), like his other early novels, received generally positive reviews, but was not a commercial success. A MacArthur Fellowship enabled him to travel to the American Southwest, where he researched and wrote his  fifth novel, Blood Meridian (1985). Although it garnered a lukewarm critical and commercial reception, it has since been regarded as his magnum opus, with some labeling it the Great American Novel.

McCarthy first experienced widespread success with All the Pretty Horses (1992), for which he received both the National Book Award and the National Book Critics Circle Award. It was followed by The Crossing (1994) and Cities of the Plain (1998), completing the Border Trilogy. His 2005 novel No Country for Old Men received mixed reviews. His 2006 novel The Road won the 2007 Pulitzer Prize for Fiction and the James Tait Black Memorial Prize for Fiction. Many of McCarthy's works have been adapted into film. No Country for Old Men was adapted into a 2007 film, winning four Academy Awards, including Best Picture. All the Pretty Horses, The Road, and Child of God have also been adapted into films, while Outer Dark was turned into a 15-minute short. McCarthy had a play adapted into a 2011 film, The Sunset Limited.

McCarthy works with  the Santa Fe Institute (SFI), a multidisciplinary research center. At the SFI, he published the essay "The Kekulé Problem" (2017), which explores the human unconscious and the origin of language. He was elected to the American Philosophical Society in 2012. His most recent novels, The Passenger and Stella Maris, were published on October 25, 2022, and December 6, 2022, respectively.

Life

Early life
McCarthy was born in Providence, Rhode Island, on July 20, 1933, one of six children of Gladys Christina McGrail and Charles Joseph McCarthy. His family were Irish Catholics. In 1937, the family relocated to Knoxville, Tennessee, where his father worked as a lawyer for the Tennessee Valley Authority. The family first lived on Noelton Drive in the upscale Sequoyah Hills subdivision, but by 1941 had settled in a house on Martin Mill Pike in South Knoxville. McCarthy would later say, "We were considered rich because all the people around us were living in one- or two-room shacks." Among his childhood friends was Jim Long (1930–2012), who would later be depicted as J-Bone in Suttree.

McCarthy attended St. Mary's Parochial School and Knoxville Catholic High School, and was an altar boy at Knoxville's Church of the Immaculate Conception. As a child, McCarthy saw no value in school, preferring to pursue his own interests. He described a moment when his teacher asked the class about their hobbies. McCarthy answered eagerly, as he later said, "I was the only one with any hobbies and I had every hobby there was ... name anything, no matter how esoteric. I could have given everyone a hobby and still had 40 or 50 to take home."

In 1951, he began attending the University of Tennessee (UTK) but dropped out in 1953 to join the United States Air Force. While stationed in Alaska, McCarthy read books voraciously, which he claimed was the first time he had done so. He returned to UTK in 1957, where he published two stories, “Wake for Susan” and "A Drowning Incident" in the student literary magazine, The Phoenix, writing under the name C. J. McCarthy, Jr. For these, he won the Ingram-Merrill Award for creative writing in 1959 and 1960. But in 1959, he dropped out of UTK for the final time and left for Chicago.

For purposes of his writing career, McCarthy changed his first name from Charles to Cormac to avoid confusion, and comparison, with ventriloquist Edgar Bergen's dummy Charlie McCarthy. Cormac had been a family nickname given to his father by his Irish aunts. Other sources say he changed his name to honor the Irish chieftain Cormac MacCarthy, who constructed Blarney Castle.

After marrying fellow student Lee Holleman in 1961, McCarthy "moved to a shack with no heat and running water in the foothills of the Smoky Mountains outside of Knoxville". There the couple had a son, Cullen, in 1962. When writer James Agee's childhood home was being demolished in Knoxville that year, McCarthy used the site's bricks to build fireplaces inside his Sevier County shack. While Lee cared for the baby and tended to the chores of the house, Cormac asked her to get a day job so he could focus on his novel writing. Dismayed with the situation, she moved to Wyoming, where she filed for divorce and landed her first job teaching.

Early writing career (1965–1991)

Random House published McCarthy's first novel, The Orchard Keeper, in 1965. He had finished the novel while working part-time at an auto-parts warehouse in Chicago and submitted the manuscript "blindly" to Albert Erskine of Random House. Erskine continued to edit McCarthy's work for the next 20 years. Upon its release, critics noted its similarity to the work of Faulkner and praised McCarthy's striking use of imagery. The Orchard Keeper won a 1966 William Faulkner Foundation Award for notable first novel.

While living in the French Quarter in New Orleans, McCarthy was expelled from a $40-a-month room for failing to pay his rent. When he traveled the country, McCarthy always carried a 100-watt bulb in his bag so he could read at night, no matter where he was sleeping.

In the summer of 1965, using a Traveling Fellowship award from The American Academy of Arts and Letters, McCarthy shipped out aboard the liner Sylvania hoping to visit Ireland. On the ship, he met Englishwoman Anne DeLisle, who was working on the ship as a dancer and singer. In 1966, they were married in England. Also in 1966, he received a Rockefeller Foundation Grant, which he used to travel around Southern Europe before landing in Ibiza, where he wrote his second novel, Outer Dark (1968). Afterward, he returned to the United States with his wife, where Outer Dark was published to generally favorable reviews.

In 1969, the couple moved to Louisville, Tennessee, and purchased a dairy barn, which McCarthy renovated, doing the stonework himself. According to DeLisle, the couple lived in "total poverty", bathing in a lake. DeLisle claimed, "Someone would call up and offer him $2,000 to come speak at a university about his books. And he would tell them that everything he had to say was there on the page. So we would eat beans for another week." While living in the barn, he wrote his next book, Child of God (1973). Like Outer Dark before it, Child of God was set in southern Appalachia. In 1976, McCarthy separated from Anne DeLisle and moved to El Paso, Texas.

In 1974, Richard Pearce of PBS contacted McCarthy and asked him to write the screenplay for an episode of Visions, a television drama series. Beginning in early 1975, and armed with only "a few photographs in the footnotes to a 1928 biography of a famous pre-Civil War industrialist William Gregg as inspiration", he and McCarthy spent a year traveling the South to research the subject of industrialization there. McCarthy completed the screenplay in 1976 and the episode, titled The Gardener's Son, aired on January 6, 1977. Numerous film festivals abroad screened it. The episode was nominated for two primetime Emmy awards in 1977.

In 1979, McCarthy published the semi-autobiographical Suttree, which he had written over 20 years before, based on his experiences in Knoxville on the Tennessee River. Jerome Charyn likened it to a doomed Huckleberry Finn.

In 1981, McCarthy was awarded a MacArthur Fellowship worth $236,000. Saul Bellow, Shelby Foote, and others had recommended him to the organization. The grant enabled him to travel to the South-West, where he could research his next novel: Blood Meridian, or the Evening Redness in the West (1985). The book is well known for its violence, with The New York Times declaring it the "bloodiest book since the Iliad". Although initially snubbed by many critics, the book has grown appreciably in stature in literary circles; Harold Bloom called Blood Meridian  "the greatest single book since Faulkner's As I Lay Dying". In a 2006 poll of authors and publishers conducted by The New York Times Magazine to list the greatest American novels of the previous quarter-century, Blood Meridian placed third, behind Toni Morrison's Beloved (1987) and Don DeLillo's Underworld (1997). Some have even suggested it is the Great American Novel. Time included it on their 2005 list of the 100 best English-language books published since 1923. At the time, McCarthy was living in a stone cottage behind an El Paso shopping center, which he described as "barely habitable".

As of 1991, none of McCarthy's novels had sold more than 5,000 hardcover copies, and "for most of his career, he did not even have an agent". He was labelled the "best unknown novelist in America".

Success and acclaim (1992–2013)

After working with McCarthy for twenty years, Albert Erskine retired from Random House in 1992. McCarthy turned to Alfred A. Knopf, where he fell under the editorial advisement of Gary Fisketjon. As a final favor to Erskine, McCarthy agreed to his first interview ever, with Richard B. Woodward of The New York Times.

McCarthy finally received widespread recognition following the publication of All the Pretty Horses (1992), when it won the National Book Award and the National Book Critics Circle Award. It became a New York Times bestseller, selling 190,000 hardcover copies within six months. It was followed by The Crossing (1994) and Cities of the Plain (1998), completing the Border Trilogy.
In the midst of this trilogy came The Stonemason (first performed in 1995), his second dramatic work.

McCarthy originally conceived his next work, No Country for Old Men (2005), as a screenplay before turning it into a novel. Consequently, the novel has little description of setting and is composed largely of dialogue. A western set in the 1980s, No Country for Old Men was adapted by the Coen brothers into a 2007 film of the same name, which won four Academy Awards and more than 75 film awards globally.

In the early 2000s, while sleeping at an El Paso motel with his son, McCarthy imagined the city in a hundred years: "fires up on the hill and everything being laid to waste". He wrote two pages covering the idea; four years later in Ireland he would expand the idea into his tenth novel, The Road. It follows a lone father and his young son traveling through a post-apocalyptic America, hunted by cannibals. Many of the discussions between the two were verbatim conversations McCarthy had had with his son. Released in 2006, it won international acclaim and the Pulitzer Prize for Fiction. McCarthy did not accept the prize in person, instead sending Sonny Mehta in his place. John Hillcoat directed the 2009 film adaptation, written by Joe Penhall, and starring Viggo Mortensen and Kodi Smit-McPhee. Critics reviews were mostly favorable: Roger Ebert found it "powerful" but lacking "emotional feeling", Peter Bradshaw noted "a guarded change of emphasis", while Dan Jolin found it to be a "faithful adaptation" of the "devastating novel".

McCarthy published the play The Sunset Limited in 2006. Critics noted it was unorthodox and may have had more in common with a novel, hence McCarthy's subtitle: "a novel in dramatic form". He later adapted it into a screenplay for a 2011 film, directed and executive produced by Tommy Lee Jones, who also starred opposite Samuel L. Jackson.
Oprah Winfrey selected McCarthy's The Road as the April 2007 selection for her Book Club. As a result, McCarthy agreed to his first television interview, which aired on The Oprah Winfrey Show on June 5, 2007. The interview took place in the library of the Santa Fe Institute. McCarthy told Winfrey that he does not know any writers and much prefers the company of scientists. During the interview, he related several stories illustrating the degree of outright poverty he endured at times during his career as a writer. He also spoke about the experience of fathering a child at an advanced age, and how his son was the inspiration for The Road.

In 2012, McCarthy sold his original screenplay The Counselor to Nick Wechsler, Paula Mae Schwartz, and Steve Schwartz, who had previously produced the film adaptation of McCarthy's novel The Road. Directed by Ridley Scott, production finished in 2012. It was released on October 25, 2013, to polarized critical reception. Mark Kermode of The Guardian found it "datedly naff"; Peter Travers of Rolling Stone described it as "a droning meditation on capitalism"; however Manohla Dargis of The New York Times found it "terrifying" and "seductive".

Santa Fe Institute (2014–present)
McCarthy is a trustee for the Santa Fe Institute (SFI), a multidisciplinary research center devoted to the study of complex adaptive systems. Unlike most members of the SFI, McCarthy does not have a scientific background. As Murray Gell-Mann explained, "There isn't any place like the Santa Fe Institute, and there isn't any writer like Cormac, so the two fit quite well together." From his work at the Santa Fe Institute, McCarthy published his first piece of nonfiction writing in his 50-year writing career. In the essay entitled "The Kekulé Problem" (2017), McCarthy analyzes a dream of August Kekulé's as a model of the unconscious mind and the origins of language. He theorizes about the nature of the unconscious mind and its separation from human language. The unconscious, according to McCarthy, "is a machine for operating an animal" and "all animals have an unconscious." McCarthy postulates that language is a purely human cultural creation and not a biologically determined phenomenon.

In 2015, McCarthy's next novel, The Passenger, was announced at a multimedia event hosted in Santa Fe by the Lannan Foundation. The book was influenced by his time among scientists; it has been described by SFI biologist David Krakauer as "full-blown Cormac 3.0—a mathematical [and] analytical novel". In March 2022, The New York Times reported that The Passenger would be released on October 25, 2022, and a second companion novel, Stella Maris, on November 22. The latter is McCarthy's first novel since Outer Dark to feature a female protagonist.

Writing approach and style

Syntax

McCarthy uses punctuation sparsely, even replacing most commas with "and" to create polysyndetons; it has been called "the most important word in McCarthy's lexicon". He told Oprah Winfrey that he prefers "simple declarative sentences" and that he uses capital letters, periods, an occasional comma, or a colon for setting off a list, but never semicolons, which he has labelled as "idiocy". He does not use quotation marks for dialogue and believes there is no reason to "blot the page up with weird little marks". Erik Hage notes that McCarthy's dialogue often lacks attribution, but that "Somehow ... the reader remains oriented as to who is speaking." His attitude to punctuation dates to some editing work he did for a professor of English while enrolled at the University of Tennessee, when he stripped out much of the punctuation in the book being edited, which pleased the professor. McCarthy edited fellow Santa Fe Institute Fellow W. Brian Arthur's influential article "Increasing Returns and the New World of Business", published in the Harvard Business Review in 1996, removing commas from the text. He has also done copy-editing work for physicists Lawrence M. Krauss and Lisa Randall.

Saul Bellow praised his "absolutely overpowering use of language, his life-giving and death-dealing sentences". Richard B. Woodward has described his writing as "reminiscent of early Hemingway". Unlike earlier works such as Suttree and Blood Meridian, the majority of McCarthy's work after 1993 uses simple, restrained vocabulary.

Themes

McCarthy's novels often depict explicit violence. Many of his works have been characterized as nihilistic, particularly Blood Meridian. Some academics dispute this, saying Blood Meridian is actually a gnostic tragedy. His later works have been characterized as highly moralistic. Erik J. Wielenberg argues that The Road depicts morality as secular and originating from individuals, such as the father, and separate from God.

The bleak outlook of the future, and the inhuman foreign antagonist Anton Chigurh of No Country for Old Men is said to reflect the apprehension of the post-9/11 era. Many of his works portray individuals in conflict with society and acting on instinct rather than on emotion or thought. Another theme throughout many of McCarthy's works is the ineptitude or inhumanity of those in authority and particularly in law enforcement. This is seen in Blood Meridian with the murder spree the Glanton Gang initiates because of the bounties, the "overwhelmed" law enforcement in No Country for Old Men, and the corrupt police officers in All the Pretty Horses. As a result, he has been labelled the "great pessimist of American literature".

Bilingual narrative practice

Cormac McCarthy is fluent in Spanish, having lived in Ibiza, Spain, in the 1960s and later residing in El Paso, Texas, and Santa Fe, New Mexico. Isabel Soto argues that after he learned the language, in his novels "Spanish and English modulate or permeate each other", as it is "an essential part of McCarthy's expressive discourse". Katherine Sugg observes that McCarthy's writing is "often considered a 'multicultural' and 'bilingual' narrative practice, particularly for its abundant use of untranslated Spanish dialogue". Jeffrey Herlihy-Mera observes: "John Grady Cole is a native speaker of Spanish. This is also the case of several other important characters in the Border Trilogy, including Billy Parhnam (sic), John Grady's mother (and possibly his grandfather and brothers), and perhaps Jimmy Blevins, each of whom are speakers of Spanish who were ostensibly born in the US political space into families with what are generally considered English-speaking surnames ... This is also the case of Judge Holden in Blood Meridian."

Work ethic and process

McCarthy has dedicated himself to writing full time, choosing not to work other jobs to support his career. "I always knew that I didn't want to work", McCarthy has said. "You have to be dedicated, but it was my number-one priority." Early in his career, his decision not to work sometimes subjected him and his family to poverty.

Nevertheless, according to scholar Steve Davis, McCarthy has an "incredible work ethic". He prefers to work on several projects simultaneously and said, for instance, that he had four drafts in progress in the mid-2000s and for several years devoted about two hours every day to each project. He is known to conduct exhaustive research on the historical settings and regional environments found in his fiction. He continually edits his own writing, sometimes revising a book over the course of years or decades before deeming it fit for publication. While his research and revision are meticulous, he does not outline his plots and instead views writing as a "subconscious process" which should be given space for spontaneous inspiration.

Since 1958, McCarthy has written all of his literary work and correspondence with a mechanical typewriter. He originally used a Royal but went looking for a more lightweight machine ahead of a trip to Europe in the early 1960s. He bought a portable Olivetti Lettera 32 for $50 at a Knoxville pawn shop and typed about five million words over the next five decades. He maintained it by simply "blowing out the dust with a service station hose". Book dealer Glenn Horowitz said the modest typewriter acquired "a sort of talismanic quality" through its connection to McCarthy's monumental fiction, "as if Mount Rushmore was carved with a Swiss Army knife". His Olivetti was auctioned in December 2009 at Christie's, with the auction house estimating it would fetch between $15,000 and $20,000. It sold for $254,500, with proceeds donated to the Santa Fe Institute. McCarthy replaced it with an identical model, bought for him by his friend John Miller for $11 plus $19.95 for shipping.

Personal life and views

McCarthy is a teetotaler. According to Richard B. Woodward: "McCarthy doesn't drink anymore – he quit 16 years ago [i.e. in 1976] in El Paso, with one of his young girlfriends – and Suttree reads like a farewell to that life. 'The friends I do have are simply those who quit drinking,' he says. 'If there is an occupational hazard to writing, it's drinking'."

In the late 1990s, McCarthy moved to the Tesuque area of New Mexico, north of Santa Fe, with his third wife, Jennifer Winkley, and their son, John. McCarthy and Winkley divorced in 2006.

In 2013, a Twitter account impersonating McCarthy (@CormacCMcCarthy) was created by Scottish writer Michael Crossan, quickly amassing several thousand followers and recognition by former site owner Jack Dorsey. Five hours after the account's creation, McCarthy's publisher confirmed that the account was fake and that McCarthy did not own a computer. In 2018, another account impersonating McCarthy (@CormacMcCrthy) was created. In 2021, it was briefly verified following a viral tweet, after which his agent confirmed that the account was fake.

In 2016, a hoax spread on Twitter claiming that McCarthy had died, with USA Today even repeating the information. The Los Angeles Times responded to the hoax with the headline, "Cormac McCarthy isn't dead. He's too tough to die."

Politics
McCarthy has not publicly revealed his political opinions. A resident of Santa Fe with a traditionalist disposition, he once expressed disapproval of the city and the people there: "If you don't agree with them politically, you can't just agree to disagree—they think you're crazy." In the 1980s, McCarthy and Edward Abbey considered covertly releasing wolves into southern Arizona to restore their decimated population.

Science and literature
In one of his few interviews, McCarthy revealed that he respects only authors who "deal with issues of life and death", citing Henry James and Marcel Proust as examples of writers who do not. "I don't understand them ... To me, that's not literature. A lot of writers who are considered good I consider strange", he said. 
Regarding his own literary constraints when writing novels, McCarthy said he is "not a fan of some of the Latin American writers, magical realism. You know, it's hard enough to get people to believe what you're telling them without making it impossible. It has to be vaguely plausible." He has cited Moby-Dick (1851) as his favorite novel.

McCarthy has an aversion to other writers, preferring the company of scientists. He has voiced his admiration for scientific advances: "What physicists did in the 20th century was one of the extraordinary flowerings ever in the human enterprise." At MacArthur reunions, McCarthy has typically shunned his fellow writers to fraternize instead with scientists like physicist Murray Gell-Mann and whale biologist Roger Payne. Of all of his interests, McCarthy stated, "Writing is way, way down at the bottom of the list."

Legacy

In 2003, literary critic Harold Bloom named McCarthy as one of the four major living American novelists, alongside Don DeLillo, Thomas Pynchon, and Philip Roth. His 1994 book The Western Canon had listed Child of God, Suttree, and Blood Meridian among the works of contemporary literature he predicted would endure and become "canonical". Bloom reserved his highest praise for Blood Meridian, which he called "the greatest single book since Faulkner's As I Lay Dying", and though he held less esteem for McCarthy's other novels he said that "to have written even one book so authentically strong and allusive, and capable of the perpetual reverberation that Blood Meridian possesses more than justifies him.... He has attained genius with that book."

A comprehensive archive of McCarthy's personal papers is preserved at the Wittliff Collections, Texas State University, San Marcos, Texas. The McCarthy papers consists of 98 boxes (46 linear feet). The acquisition of the Cormac McCarthy Papers resulted from years of ongoing conversations between McCarthy and Southwestern Writers Collection founder, Bill Wittliff, who negotiated the proceedings. The Southwestern Writers Collection/Wittliff Collections also holds The Wolmer Collection of Cormac McCarthy, which consists of letters between McCarthy and bibliographer J. Howard Woolmer, and four other related collections.

Bibliography

Notes

References

Further reading

 (updated version published October 26, 2011)

External links

 The Cormac McCarthy Society
 Southwestern Writers Collection at the Wittliff Collections, Texas State University – Cormac McCarthy Papers
 
 
 Western American Literature Journal: Cormac McCarthy

 
1933 births
20th-century American dramatists and playwrights
20th-century American male writers
20th-century American novelists
20th-century American short story writers
21st-century American dramatists and playwrights
21st-century American essayists
21st-century American male writers
21st-century American non-fiction writers
21st-century American novelists
21st-century American short story writers
American alternate history writers
American crime fiction writers
American historical novelists
American horror novelists
American male dramatists and playwrights
American male essayists
American male non-fiction writers
American male novelists
American male screenwriters
American male short story writers
American people of Irish descent
American speculative fiction writers
Believer Book Award winners
Environmental fiction writers
James Tait Black Memorial Prize recipients
Living people
MacArthur Fellows
Maltese Falcon Award winners
Minimalist writers
National Book Award winners
The New Yorker people
Novelists from Tennessee
Novelists from Texas
People from El Paso, Texas
People from Knoxville, Tennessee
People from Tesuque, New Mexico
Philosophical pessimists
Pulitzer Prize for Fiction winners
Santa Fe Institute people
Screenwriters from New Mexico
Screenwriters from Rhode Island
Screenwriters from Tennessee
Screenwriters from Texas
Theorists on Western civilization
United States Air Force airmen
University of Tennessee alumni
Weird fiction writers
Western (genre) writers
Writers from Santa Fe, New Mexico
Writers of Gothic fiction
Writers of historical fiction set in the modern age
Writers of historical mysteries
Writers of historical romances